The Friesian cross (also Friesian/x and Friesian Sport Horse) is a horse breed produced by crossbreeding the Friesian horse.

The breeding of Friesian Crosses has become increasingly popular in the United States, with various registries often being created to recognize certain specific crosses.  Friesian crosses may be considered sport horses (suitable for the sports of dressage, combined driving, eventing, and jumping), or they may be considered pleasure horses.

Some popular crosses include Friesians crossed with draft horses (primarily Percherons), Morgans (Friesian/Morgan is known as a "Moriesian"), Arabians, Andalusians (Friesian/Andalusian is known as a Warlander), Paints, Appaloosa, Saddlebreds (Friesian/Saddlebred is known as a "Georgian Grande"), Thoroughbreds, and Tennessee Walkers (Friesian/Tennessee Walker is known as a "Friewalker".) Other crosses include Warmbloods and other sport horse types.

Characteristics
Friesian Crosses can be any color, type, or size.  They tend to maintain some of the characteristics of the Friesian (such as the temperament, long manes, and feathering), and often inherit some of the flashier movement of the Friesian.  They are popular for a variety of uses, including dressage, eventing, and driving, as well as family and pleasure horses.

External links 
 Friesian Horse Society North American Friesian and Part-bred Registry with International UELN for the Friesian horse in North America
 Friesian Heritage Horse and Sporthorse International Friesian Heritage Horse and Sporthorse International
 Friesian Sport Horse Registry  Friesian Sport Horse Registry
 Friesian Blood Horse Registry  Friesian Blood Horse Registry
 American Friesian Association American Friesian Association 
 International Georgian Grande Horse Registry International Georgian Grande Horse Registry
 Moriesian Horse Registry Moriesian Horse Registry
 International Warlander Society & Registry International Warlander Society & Registry
 Friewalker Registry  Friewalker Registry

Horse breeds
Horse breeds originating in the United States